Dillonvale is the name of two places in the U.S. state of Ohio:
Dillonvale, Hamilton County, Ohio
Dillonvale, Jefferson County, Ohio